Two TV journalists have become known as the Scud Stud:

 Canadian Arthur Kent, when working for NBC in the 1991 Gulf War
 Somali-born Rageh Omaar, when working for the BBC in the 2003 Iraq War